Mando Dairo railway station is located in Mando Dairo village, Sukkur district of Sindh province, Pakistan.

See also
 List of railway stations in Pakistan
 Pakistan Railways

References

External links

Railway stations in Sukkur District
Railway stations on Karachi–Peshawar Line (ML 1)